Diospyros maingayi is a tree in the family Ebenaceae. The twigs dry black. Inflorescences bear up to four flowers. The tree is named for British botanist A. C. Maingay. Habitat is peat swamp and other lowland forests. D. maingayi is found in Sumatra, Peninsular Malaysia and Borneo.

References

maingayi
Trees of Sumatra
Trees of Peninsular Malaysia
Trees of Borneo
Plants described in 1873